Hayri Kozakçıoğlu (1938 – May 23, 2013) was a Turkish high-ranking civil servant and politician. He served as district governor, police chief, province governor in various administrative divisions. He was known as the first regional governor in the state of emergency ("OHAL") imposed in the provinces of Southeastern Anatolia and governor of Istanbul Province. He was found dead on May 23, 2013 in his house at Sarıyer, Istanbul.

Early life and career
Hayri Kozakçıoğlu was born in 1938 to Ahmet and his spouse Lütfiye in Alaşehir, Manisa Province.

After completing his primary education in Alaşehir, Kozakçıoğlu attended Atatürk High School in Izmir, finishing in 1955. He was educated then in political science at Ankara University between 1955-1959.

Following his graduation in 1959, he entered state service in the Ministry of the Interior, becoming a candidate district governor. Kozakçıoğlu served later as district governor in Çamlıhemşin, Ardeşen, Delice, Çüngüş, Çınar, Kepsut and Gökçeada (Imbros).

In 1970, he was promoted to the post of an inspector at the ministry, and became later chief inspector.

After receiving special training by Scotland Yard in security matters, he was appointed in 1978 governor of Erzurum Province. His next post was the office of police chief in Istanbul Province for the period July 17, 1978 – December 18, 1979.

Kozakçıoğlu served as governor for three years in Adana Province and then for three and half years in Sakarya Province. On January 12, 1987, he was appointed governor of Diyarbakır Province.

A region known as the OHAL region was established in 1987 in Southeastern Anatolia, which at the beginning included eight provinces such as Bingöl, Diyarbakır, Elazığ, Hakkari, Mardin, Siirt, Tunceli and Van. Kozakçıoğlu became the first regional governor, appointed by President Turgut Özal. Called "super governor", he took office on 19 July 1987.

Kozakçıoğlu was appointed on August 19, 1991 governor of Istanbul Province, the most populated administrative division in Turkey.

On March 12, 1995, an attack on a cafe in the mainly by Alevi inhabited Gazi neighborhood in Istanbul resulted in the death of one person and twenty five people were wounded. This assault triggered riots in the Gazi Quarter that lasted for several days. People took to the streets and the police and Gendarmerie surrounded the neighborhood. More than 20 people died as the police shot at the crowds. Kozakçıoğlu imposed martial law over the locations in unrest for three days.

At this post, he served until his resignation on November 1, 1995 to enter politics.

Politics
After his retirement from the state service, Kozakçıoğlu joined True Path Party (DYP), and was elected to the parliament as a deputy of Istanbul following the 1995 general elections held on December 24. At the party, he served as the deputy chairman. He was reelected a second time as deputy of Istanbul into the parliament after the 1999 general elections held on April 18.

Family life
Kozakçıoğlu married in 1959 to Sabire. The couple has two daughters Faika (Alan, married 1992), Meral (Özekici, married 1999) and a son Ferhan.

Legacy
A vocational high school in Kağıthane, Istanbul is named after him.

Scandals
According to news published in September 1993 by the Turkish media, Hayri Kozakçıoğlu was accused of having speculated by transferring 2 billion Turkish Lira (approx. $250,000) of the funds provided by the United Nations from the regional governor's account to his private account, at the time he was the regional governor. He claimed that he did transfer the money on August 12, 1991 with the approval of Interior Minister Mustafa Kalemli, and he paid the amount back on January 18, 1993 upon the regional governor's request. However, Minister Kalemli stated that he had had no knowledge about this transaction.

Prime minister Tansu Çiller demanded Hayri Kozakçıoğlu's resignation. President Süleyman Demirel declared that "the funds were dedicated for discretionary spending in fight against terror. To disclose for what reason the funds were spent, might bring the state in difficulties".

He and his family members were repeatedly the subject of scandal news coverage. His spouse and daughters were criticized for living in over-proportional standards. His son was accused of sexual harassment by a model.

Death
In the early morning of May 23, 2013, Kozakçıoğlu was found dead in his villa at Reşitpaşa neighborhood of Sarıyer, Istanbul. He was shot at close range in the left side of his chest, and the gun was found next to him. An official autopsy will clarify whether it was suicide. He was survived by his wife Sabire, two daughters, Faika, Prof. Dr. Meral Kozakçıoğlu Özekici and son Ferhan. On May 25, he was buried at the Zincirlikuyu Cemetery following the religious funeral at Teşvikiye Mosque

References

2013 deaths
1938 births
People from Alaşehir
Ankara University Faculty of Political Sciences alumni
Turkish civil servants
Governors of Adana
Governors of Diyarbakır
Politics of Erzurum Province
Governors of Istanbul
Politics of Sakarya Province
Turkish police chiefs
Democrat Party (Turkey, current) politicians
Deputies of Istanbul
Deaths by firearm in Turkey
Burials at Zincirlikuyu Cemetery
Members of the 21st Parliament of Turkey
Members of the 20th Parliament of Turkey